Pyongyang Medical University  is the top medical school in North Korea.

History 
After the Department of Medical Science at Kim Il-sung University was split up in 1948, the Pyongyang Medical University was officially established by the North Korean government.

In 1962, Kim Bong-han, a Professor of Pyongyang Medical University, reported that he had found the anatomical structure of meridian-collaterals, which he named Bonghan corpuscles (BHCs) and Bonghan ducts (BHDs).

References 

Universities in North Korea
Education in Pyongyang
Educational institutions established in 1948
1948 establishments in North Korea